The Danish Party was a political party in the German Empire.

History
The party was established in 1871 to represent the 50,000-strong Danish population of North Schleswig, who remained opposed to their separation from Denmark following the Second Schleswig War in 1864. It won a seat in every Reichstag elected between 1871 and 1912. Its best performance was in the 1881 elections, the only occasion on which it won two seats.

The party disappeared after World War I, following the Schleswig Plebiscites and the return of Northern Schleswig to Denmark.

References

Defunct regional parties in Germany
 
Political parties established in 1871
Political parties of minorities in Germany
Politics of Schleswig-Holstein